The white-throated magpie-jay (Calocitta formosa) is a large Central American species of magpie-jay. It ranges in Pacific-slope thorn forest from Jalisco, Mexico to Guanacaste, Costa Rica. Magpie-jays are noisy, gregarious birds, often traveling in easy-to-find flocks, mobbing their observers.

Taxonomy
The white-throated magpie-jay was formally described in 1827 by the English naturalist William John Swainson from a specimen that had been collected by the naturalist William Bullock in Temascaltepec, Mexico. Swainson coined the binomial name Pica formosa. The specific epithet is from the Latin formosus meaning "beautiful". The white-throated magpie-jay is one of two magpie-jays now placed in the genus Calocitta that was introduced in 1841 by the English zoologist George Robert Gray with the white-throated magpie-jay as the type species.

The white-throated magpie-jay hybridizes in Jalisco with the black-throated magpie-jay (C. colliei), with which it forms a superspecies. There are three recognised subspecies, the nominate race, which is only found in southern Mexico; C. f. azurea, which is found in south eastern Mexico and western Guatemala, and C. f. pompata, which runs from south eastern Mexico to Costa Rica.

Description

The species has a particularly long tail and a slightly curved crest of feathers on the head. The crest is black in the nominate race, but has blue or white margins on the other two subspecies. The nominate race has a white face with a black crown and margin to the face, forming a narrow band around the throat, as well as a small drop below the eye. The black is less extensive in the other subspecies. The breast, belly and underside of the rump are white, and the wings, mantle and tail are blue (with whitish margins on the tail). The legs and eye are black, and the bill is grey. The plumage of the females is mostly as that of the male but duller on the top, with a narrower band across the chest, and the tail is shorter.

Distribution and habitat
It occurs rarely in columnar cacti forest, but is common in thorn forest, gallery forest, deciduous woodland, forest edges and cultivated areas like coffee plantations. The species does not undertake any migratory movements, although males disperse away from their natal territories a few years after fledging. It is a common species across its range, and is not considered threatened by human activities.

Behaviour
White-throated magpie-jays are omnivorous, consuming a wide range of animal and plant matter. Items included in the diet include invertebrates such as insects and caterpillars, frogs, lizards, eggs and nestlings of other birds, seeds, fruits, grain, and nectar from Balsa blossoms. Younger birds take several years to acquire the full range of foraging skills of their parents.

References

External links

 
 
 
 
 

white-throated magpie-jay
Birds of Mexico
Birds of Guatemala
Birds of El Salvador
Birds of Honduras
Birds of Nicaragua
Birds of Costa Rica
white-throated magpie-jay
Taxa named by William John Swainson
Taxobox binomials not recognized by IUCN